Heinz Schilling (born 23 May 1942) is a German historian.

Life 

Heinz Schilling was born in Bergneustadt in Berg and grew up in Cologne. After studying history, German, philosophy and sociology at the University of Cologne and completing a state teaching certification, Schilling moved on to take a doctorate in 1971 at the University of Freiburg with a study of social and religious history of Dutch exiles, working with Gottfried Schramm. From 1971 to 1979 Schilling worked as an assistant and lecturer at the department of medieval history and then in early modern history at the newly founded Faculty of History at the University of Bielefeld. He completed his Habilitation there in 1977/78 with a case study of territorial societal history and "Confessionalization" (committee members Wolfgang Mager, Reinhart Koselleck and Bernd Moeller). From 1979 to 1982 he was professor of early modern history at the University of Osnabrück and from 1982 to 1992 professor at the University of Giessen. In 1992 he was appointed to the newly established chair of early modern European history as part of the foundation of the Institute of Historical Studies (Instituts für Geschichtswissenschaften) at the Humboldt University of Berlin, which he held until his retirement at the end of the 2010 summer semester.

Research interests 

 the comparative history of Europe in the early modern period 
 the international system 
 the political and cultural origins of national identity in Europe
 the history of the Holy Roman Empire and its constituent territories 
 immigration and minorities in old Europe (Germany, England, the Netherlands)
 cities and bourgeois life in the early modern period and the transition to the modern world
 the history of political theory 
 the Reformation and European Confessionalization
 the social and cultural history of Calvinism from the 16th to the 19th centuries 
 the early modern modernization of Germany and the Netherlands 
 historical exhibits in museums

Memberships and honors (selected) 

 since 1996 member of the Berlin-Brandenburg Academy of Sciences
 1998/99 chair of the scholarly committee for the European exhibition "1648 – Krieg und Frieden in Europa“, Münster/Osnabrück
 since 2001 chair of the Vereins für Reformationsgeschichte (Society for Reformation Research—German branch)
 2002 Dr A. H. Heineken Prize for History of the Royal Netherlands Academy of Arts and Sciences
 2003/04 fellow of the Netherlands Institute for Advanced Study (NIAS)
 2004 foreign member of the Royal Netherlands Academy of Arts and Sciences
 2004/05 fellow of the Historisches Kolleg, Munich  
 since 2004 corresponding member of the British Academy
 since 2005 member of the Academia Europaea
 2006 12th Stern Lecture Series of the Historical Society of Israel,  May 9–16, 2006, Jerusalem
 2009 honorary doctorate (Dr. theol. honoris causa) from the Theology Faculty of the University of Göttingen

Selected works 
Books
 Niederländische Exulanten im 16. Jahrhundert. Ihre Stellung im Sozialgefüge und im religiösen Leben deutscher und englischer Städte, Gütersloh, 1972
 Konfessionskonflikt und Staatsbildung. Eine Fallstudie über das Verhältnis von religiösem und sozialem Wandel in der Frühneuzeit am Beispiel der Grafschaft Lippe, Gütersloh: G. Mohn, 1981, = Quellen und Forschungen zur Reformationsgeschichte, hg. im Auftrag des Vereins für Reformationsgeschichte von G.A. Benrath, Bd. 48
 Mitten in Europa - Deutsche Geschichte (with H. Boockmann, H. Schulze, M. Stürmer), Berlin, 1984; reprinted. 
 Bürgerliche Eliten in den Niederlanden und in Nordwestdeutschland. Studien zur Sozialgeschichte des europäischen Bürgertums im Mittelalter und in der Neuzeit, Cologne/Vienna: Böhlau, 1985, = Städteforschung, Reihe A, Bd. 23 ed. with H. Diederiks)
 Aufbruch und Krise. Deutsche Geschichte von 1517 bis 1648, Berlin: Siedler, 1988
 Höfe und Allianzen. Deutsche Geschichte von 1648 bis 1763, Berlin: Siedler, 1989
 Religion, Political Culture and the Emergence of Early Modern Society. Leiden: Brill 1992  
 Die neue Zeit: Vom Christenheitseuropa zum Europa der Staaten, 1250 bis 1750, Siedler, 1999
 "1648 - Krieg und Frieden in Europa“, Europaratsausstellung zum 350. Jahrestag des Westfälischen Friedens, 3 vols., ed. with K. Bußmann, Munich, 1998
 Die neue Zeit. Vom Christenheitseuropa zum Europa der Staaten. 1250 bis 1750 (= Siedler Geschichte Europas, vol. 3). Berlin, 1999
 "La confessionalisation et le système international", in: Lucien Bély (Hg.): „L’Europe des traités de Westphalie. Esprit de la diplomatie et diplomatie de l’esprit“, Paris (Presses Universitaires de France) 2000, pp. 411–428
 Ausgewählte Abhandlungen zur europäischen Reformations- und Konfessionsgeschichte, Berlin: Duncker und Humblot, 2002  
 Europa in der werdenden Neuzeit – oder: Was heißt und zu welchem Ende studiert man europäische Geschichte?, in: Royal Netherlands Academy of Arts and Sciences. Heineken Lectures 2002, Amsterdam 2003, pp. 62–81
 Das Reich als Verteidigungs- und Friedensorganisation, in: Altes Reich und Neue Staaten, 1495-1806. 29. Ausstellung des Europarates in Berlin und Magdeburg im Deutschen Historischen Museum, Berlin, 28. August bis 10. Dezember 2006, Band 2, Dresden
 Konfessioneller Fundamentalismus. Religion als politischer Faktor im europäischen Mächtesystem um 1600 (= Schriften des Historischen Kollegs, Bd. 70), ed. Heinz Schilling with the assistance of Elisabeth Müller-Luckner, Munich, 2007
 Konfessionalisierung und Staatsinteressen. Internationale Beziehungen 1559 - 1660, Handbuch der Geschichte der internationalen Beziehungen (Band 2), Paderborn, 2007 ( oder )
 Early modern European Civilisation and its political and cultural dynamics, The Menahem Stern Jerusalem Lectures 2006. Hannover und London, 2008
 Konfesjonalizacja – Kosciól i panstwo w Europie doby przednowoczesnej, Poznan, 2010
 Martin Luther: Rebell in einer Zeit des Umbruchs, München, 2013 (English translation: Martin Luther: Rebel in an Age of Upheaval, Oxford University press, 2017)
Collected essays
 Civic Calvinism in Northwestern Germany and the Netherlands, Sixteenth to Nineteenth Centuries, Kirksville/Mo (SCJ Publishers)1991, = Sixteenth Century Essays and Studies, Bd. 17
 Religion, Political Culture, and the Emergence of Early Modern Society, Essays in German and Dutch History, Leiden (E. J. Brill) 1992
 Die Stadt in der Frühen Neuzeit, München 1993, =  Enzyklopädie Deutscher Geschichte, Bd. 24., 2. Auflage München 2004
 Ausgewählte Abhandlungen zur europäischen Reformations- und Konfessionsgeschichte, hg. v. Luise Schorn-Schütte und Olaf Mörke, = Historische Forschungen, Bd. 75, Berlin (Duncker &Humblot,) 2002

Further reading 
 Stefan Ehrenpreis, ed. Wege der Neuzeit. Festschrift für Heinz Schilling zum 65. Geburtstag. Historische Forschungen, Band 85. Duncker & Humblot, Berlin 2007, 656 S.,

References

External links 
 
 Institut für Geschichtswissenschaften - Lehrstuhl für Geschichte der Frühen Neuzeit
 Audio recording of lecture (Religion and migration in early modern Europe – the Calvinist and the Sephardic experience) given in the UCD Humanities Institute. June 2011

1942 births
Living people
Corresponding Fellows of the British Academy
20th-century German historians
German male non-fiction writers
Academic staff of the Humboldt University of Berlin
Members of Academia Europaea
Members of the Royal Netherlands Academy of Arts and Sciences
People from Bergneustadt
People from the Rhine Province
Reformation historians
Academic staff of the University of Giessen
Winners of the Heineken Prize
21st-century German historians